L'Équilibre is the fourth studio album recorded by French pop-rock band Kyo. It was released on March 24, 2014.

Track listing

References

2014 albums
Kyo (band) albums